The Roman Catholic Diocese of Palmeira dos Índios is a diocese located in the city of Palmeira dos Índios in the Ecclesiastical province of Maceió in Brazil.

History
 February 10, 1962: Established as Diocese of Palmeira dos Índios from the Metropolitan Archdiocese of Maceió and Diocese of Penedo

Bishops
 Bishops of Palmeira dos Índios (Roman rite), in reverse chronological order
 Bishop Manoel de Oliveira Soares Filho (2018.12.19 - present)
 Bishop Dulcênio Fontes de Matos (2006.07.12 – 2017.10.11), appointed Bishop of Campina Grande, Paraiba
 Bishop Fernando Iório Rodrigues (1985.03.01 – 2006.07.12)
 Bishop Epaminondas José de Araújo (1978.06.05 – 1984.11.28)
 Bishop Otávio Barbosa Aguiar (1962.07.04 – 1978.03.29)

Other priest of this diocese who became bishop
Hélio Pereira dos Santos, appointed Auxiliary Bishop of São Salvador da Bahia in 2016

References
 GCatholic.org
 Catholic Hierarchy

Roman Catholic dioceses in Brazil
Christian organizations established in 1962
Palmeira dos Indios, Roman Catholic Diocese of
Roman Catholic dioceses and prelatures established in the 20th century